Zibusi (Daqing Yi 大箐彝) is a recently discovered Loloish language of Heqing County, Yunnan, China.

References

Loloish languages